Molly Moon's Homemade Ice Cream is an ice cream parlor with multiple locations in the Seattle metropolitan area, in the U.S. state of Washington. The business was founded by chief executive officer Molly Moon Neitzel. Ice cream is made on-site in each of its shops, rather than in central commissaries, to avoid the possibility that ice cream will partially melt and refreeze during delivery.

History

A location opened in the Madrona neighborhood in May 2011. A fifth location opened in downtown Seattle in June. The Queen Anne location opened in September 2011. On opening day, the shop offered free ice cream scoops to children.

Molly Moon's built small parks outside shops in Wallingford and Madrona in 2014, as part of Seattle's pilot parklet program. In 2014, the company was sued for an "intolerable odor that purportedly made employees sick".

A seventh shop opened in Redmond in 2016, and an eighth location opened in Columbia City in 2017. Free scoops for children were offered for the opening of the Columbia City location.

All shops offered free scoops to the first 100 customers for the company's tenth anniversary in 2018.

In 2020, following the removal of the Capitol Hill Occupied Protest, Molly Moon's Capitol Hill location attracted national news attention for posting a sign asking armed police officers not to enter the shop, including them under its "gun free zone" policy.

Reception
Eater Seattle included Molly Moon's in 2021 list of "Great Places to Get Ice Cream and Gelato in Seattle".

References

External links

 
 Molly Moon’s Homemade Ice Cream at Seattle Metropolitan

Downtown Seattle
Ice cream parlors in the United States
Queen Anne, Seattle
Redmond, Washington
Restaurants in Seattle
Wallingford, Seattle